James William Lumsden (24 December 1924 – 7 September 1988) was an Australian rules footballer who played with St Kilda in the Victorian Football League (VFL).

Lumsden was recruited to St. Kilda from Katamatite Football Club after he won the 1947 - O'Dwyer Medal in the Murray Football League.

He also served in the RAAF in World War II.

Notes

External links 

1924 births
1988 deaths
Australian rules footballers from Melbourne
St Kilda Football Club players
People from Armadale, Victoria
Royal Australian Air Force personnel of World War II
Military personnel from Melbourne